Amb is a town situated in the district of Una in Himachal Pradesh state of India. It is situated in the Shivalik region of Indian subcontinent. It is a sub-division and tehsil of Una district. The town was named Amb after the name of the goddess Amba, deity situated in nearby Chintpurni.

Geography and Demographics
Amb is located in the Soan valley surrounded by mountains of the Shivalik ranges. 
It has a population of around 15,000 people. Some localities of Amb are Heera Nagar, Pratap Nagar, Adarsh Nagar, Sham Nagar.

Language
The local language is Himachali [Pahari]. Hindi and English languages are used for official purpose.

Education
Amb has various educational institutions including a government senior secondary school,  Indian Public School, Shivalik Hill Pub Sr. Sec. School, Sudha Model School, Swami Vivekananda school, Sh. Guru Nanak Dev Sr. Sec. School  and Maharana Pratap College being one of them. 
Maharana Pratap Govt. College, Amb came into being on 18 June 1997 when the Himachal Pradesh Government took over the erstwhile National College, Amb, established in 1970. The College is situated in the center of the Amb town on the National Highway(NH 70), 32 km from Una, the District headquarters, on the way to the famous shrine of the goddess Chintpurni.

History
Amb has some ancient historical ruins of royal palaces and gardens.
In the year 1877, at the request of Maharaja Ranbir Singh of Jammu and Kashmir, the British government restored to Raja Ran Singh the Jagir in Jaswan, originally held by Raja Ummed Singh consisting of 21 villages in Jaswan Dun valley and the family garden at Amb, as well as palace buildings of Raja Ummed Singh at Rajpura. Raja Ran Singh died in 1892 and was succeeded by his son Raja Raghunath Singh who died in 1918. Thereafter, Raja Laxman Singh succeeded him and was in turn succeeded by his son Raja Chain Singh. After his death in 2009, Raja Nagendra singh succeeded him and get family palace in Amb estate of H.P and brothers of Raja laxman Singh namely Rajkumar Hardev Singh and Rajkumar Shiv Dev Singh  look after their Ramkot estate in District Kathua of Jammu province and immovable land properties in village Samnavanj and its adjoining villages at tehsil Ramnagar of District Udhampur of Jammu province which was gifted by Maharaja of Jammu and kashmir Raja Ranbir Singh. The immovable land properties, buildings and palaces left behind after the death of Raja Raghunath Singh which are situated in Amb estate in H.P and in Ramkot estate in J&K respectively is still matter of dispute between the descendants of Raja Raghunath Singh. Now the next generation of both the families of Rajkumar Shiv Dev and Rajkumar Hardev now fight for their rightful claim in property of Ramkot estate of District kathua of Jammu province. 

.

Communication and transport
●By Road:
Amb has a small bus stand. Buses are available for all major towns of Himachal and North India including Delhi, Chandigarh, Shimla, Hoshiarpur, Jalandhar, Amritsar and Dharmshala.

●By Railway:
The Amb railway station (Station Code-AADR) is situated 1.8 km from the bus stand. The station consists of 2 platforms. The station lies on the under-construction track from Una to Talwara. Track construction has been completed up to Daultpur Chowk, a town in district Una.

The following trains are best suited:

■Himachal Express (14553): Daily, Delhi to Amb Andaura, Himachal Pradesh. Leaves Old Delhi railway station at 11.30 pm and reaches Amb Andaura station at 8 am.

■Jan Shatabadi (12057): Daily, Delhi to Una Himachal. Leaves New Delhi railway station at 3 pm and reaches Una at 10 pm.

■DMU Shuttle Train Service (74992): Daily, Ambala to Amb Andaura via Nangal Dam and Una.

●By Air:
The nearest domestic airport to the Amb is the Gaggal airport, situated at a distance of 82 km followed by Ludhiana airport, located at a distance of 122 km. The Chandigarh airport which is 156 km away from the Amb is the nearest international airport.

Industries 

Amb Town is also an industrial zone of Himachal Pradesh. Many units including Sonalika (Tractor manufacturer), Kamdhenu (kamakshi) Saria Factory and Him cylinders are located in this town.
Jindal group also established here its new textile plants i.e. Jindal Medicot, JSTL and HTPL. Another textile fabric unit named Paragon knits limited started in 2014, manufacturing fabric for brands like Reebok Adidas, etc. Paragon have zero discharge ETP plant.

Nearby places 
1. Bompay picnic spot is situated 7 km from the Amb. Other picnic spots like Ambay picnic spot is situated in between 2–3 km from Amb. Himalayan Dhaba and Sweets is situated on Una road Amb and famous for its food and sweets.

2. Some other places of interest Chintpurni Temple, Kamakhaya Devi Temple, Pollia Purohitan Una district, Thaneek Pura, Nehrian , Daulatpur, Dera Baba Badbhag Singh Ji Mairi, Lohara, Gagret, Hoshiarpur, Pragpur, Jawalamukhi, Pong Dam, Chalet.

3. There is also a Haveli situated in outskirts of Amb (about 9 km from Amb).

References 

Cities and towns in Una district
Tehsils of Himachal Pradesh